Kango is a town in the Estuaire Province of Gabon.

Kango may also refer to:
Kango, a rural land region north of the town Oudtshoorn in South Africa
Kango people, Mbuty Pygmy people of the Ituri Rainforest, eastern Democratic Republic of the Congo
Kango language, Bantu language spoken by some of the Kango people
Kango language (Bas-Uélé District), Bantu language spoken in Bas-Uele District, northern Democratic Republic of the Congo
Sino-Japanese vocabulary, also called by its Japanese name kango (漢語)
Slang term for jackhammer
A brand of jackhammer made by the Milwaukee Electric Tool Corporation

People with the name Kango include:
Mayuri Kango (born 1982), Indian actress from Aurangabad
Naaba Kango (fl. 1754–1787), ruler of the Mossi state of Yatenga in present-day Burkina Faso; see List of rulers of the Mossi state of Yatenga

See also
Qango, acronym for Quasi-Autonomous Non-Governmental Organisation